Héracles Paiva Aguiar (born September 18, 1992), better known as Héracles, is a retired Brazilian footballer. He most recently played for Ypiranga as a left back.

Career
He started his career at Atlético Paranaense in 2010, before moving to Avaí in 2013. He was signed by Ceará in 2015.

Career statistics
(Correct )

References

External links

Héracles at ogol.com 

1992 births
Living people
Brazilian footballers
Campeonato Brasileiro Série A players
Campeonato Brasileiro Série B players
Club Athletico Paranaense players
Avaí FC players
Ceará Sporting Club players
Association football fullbacks
Sportspeople from Ceará
Brazilian people of Portuguese descent
Citizens of Portugal through descent